Wallace is the protagonist of Hell and Back, the longest of the Sin City yarns written by Frank Miller.

Wallace starts off as an ex-military civilian. He is a more upright, middle class citizen than Marv or Dwight McCarthy, but also not an epitome of righteousness like John Hartigan, none of whom he has any contact with.

A demobilized Navy SEAL who received the Medal of Honor, he lives a life of relative peace and solitude against the backdrop of crime-ridden Basin City. Having left the Navy years prior, he makes a living as an artist (usually for sleazy magazines, to his great disgust) and as a short order cook. His life changes drastically when he saves a suicidal woman named Esther from drowning. She is kidnapped and enslaved by the Colonel, one of Basin City's most powerful crime bosses, sending Wallace on a single-minded journey to rescue her and take down those responsible, no matter who gets in his way.

Appearance and personality
In his late 30s or early 40s, Wallace appears to be around 5 foot 10 inches, to 6 foot tall. He has a lean, muscular build, long black hair, and stubble. His normal attire consists of a black T-shirt, black jeans, Converse All-Star shoes, and an ankle-length trench coat. Wallace dresses in such shabby clothing that he is sometimes mistaken for a bum. His long hair and stubble earn him frequent taunts from the police.  He drives a Buick LeSabre convertible.

Wallace is a skilled artist, and a talented painter (none of his paintings were seen, but every character who noticed them was impressed). For a citizen of Basin City he is quite prudish, as when he chose to tear up a nude portrait he created rather than allow it to be chosen over a more tasteful painting. He was caught by surprise when the assassin Delia (a.k.a. Blue Eyes) propositioned him. He is very respectful toward the opposite sex referring to women as "Ma'am" regardless of age or status. He does not, however, share Marv's aversion to hurting women, as shown by his lethal actions toward female opponents. He notices the smell of cigarette smoke quite easily.

It is implied that his childhood was spent growing up in New England. Little is known about Wallace's past in the military, but he keeps scars from this part of his life.  Most of the time Wallace is self-assured, self-confident and cool-headed, remaining so even in mortal peril, implying extensive combat training and experience. Though he is honest, warm-hearted, selfless and pacifistic, Wallace can be stirred to violent action when it is required, such as for revenge. He never shows exterior signs of panic and doesn't seem to fear anything. Wallace (understandably) dislikes the police, comparing them to the same people that worked for Stalin (the KGB).

Whenever under intense stress, he meditates. This helps him clear his mind and recall things that might have escaped him in the heat of the moment. Using this method, he is able to recall how he was first drugged by the Colonel's subordinates and what happened to Esther when she was taken by them. It also seemed to lessen the effects of a powerful hallucinogen injected into him when men working for the Colonel try to frame him. He mentions that he has been meditating for much of his life, referring to things having "gotten bad" during his childhood. He also mentions that his meditation saved his life during "the mission," alluding to the mission where he earned the Medal of Honor.

Character history
The main character of Hell and Back, Wallace is one of a few truly virtuous characters in Sin City. However, as an ex Navy SEAL, he also ranks among the deadliest.

Hell and Back

Wallace, a former navy seal, broke artist and occasional short-order cook loses his job as a pornography painter after ripping apart his sleazy contract work in front of the publisher. On his way home, he rescues a suicidal black woman named Esther after she jumped into the sea. At his home, Esther is looked after by Wallace`s Landlady Mrs. Mendoza, a former nurse. Esther then offers Wallace to buy him a drink at a nearby bar. While taking a walk, they kiss, before Wallace gets hit by a tranquilizer dart and falls unconscious.

When he comes to, he is arrested by abusive policemen for vagrancy. In the cell, he meditates and remembers that Esther was kidnapped by two men. When he reports this to the police Lieutenant Liebowitz, he is told to be quiet about the affair. On his way home, Wallace is intimidated to lay off his investigation of the kidnapping by the same cops who put him in jail. He attacks and robs them. Back at his home, Mrs. Mendoza tells Wallace that she took Esther's business card, with Esther's address on it. He heads to Esther's apartment where he finds Delia, who claims to be Esther's roommate and makes a pass at him. While there, they are attacked by Manute and a sniper. After Wallace defeats them, they leave and get chased by a Mercedes, which is also dispatched by Wallace.

Since his car is bullet-riddled and easily identifiable, Wallace visits his former Navy seal captain and his male lover Jerry at a nearby farm. After changing cars, Wallace and Delia rent a room in a hotel. Wallace orders her to take off her clothes, lie in bed and close her eyes. Expecting sex, she complies and Wallace handcuffs her to the bed. He then tells her that he knows she is not Esther's roommate because her cigarette smoke scent was not on Esther, but immediately after he is shot by a sniper through the window. When Wallace returns to consciousness he is put in a car by Delia's henchman Gordo and is drugged by the pharmacologist Maxine. Inside the trunk of the car is the body of a young girl, to insinuate Wallace being a child killer who drove over a cliff while intoxicated. Wallace is then rescued by his former captain. The heavily hallucinating Wallace and his captain torture one of the surviving perimeter snipers to discern Esther`s location, which is at an old factory complex. On their way there, the encounter Delia`s group and attack them. The Captain is killed, but Wallace manages to force Maxine to administer an antidote for his hallucinations, before he accidentally shoots her too. He then also shoots the wounded Delia and takes the Captain`s body back to Jerry.

Wallace goes to the old factory complex where he finds a black market operation which trafficks babies, women and live organs. He goes to Lieutenant Liebowitz' house to tell him about the human trafficking, only to find out that the Lieutenant knew all along and is in on the take. While they are talking, the phone rings and Wallace is offered Esther's life in exchange for him letting the black market operation continue. Wallace accepts, and goes to retrieve Esther from the abandoned Roark Family Farm. When he finds Esther naked in the barn, he puts his Kevlar coat on her. While leaving, they are attacked by a helicopter, which is dispatched by Jerry who secured the perimeter. Wallace and Jerry take Esther to the hospital. Shortly after, the victims from the human trafficking factory are brought in by policemen, under orders of Lieutenant Liebowitz. After a few days, he and Esther move out of Sin City.

Special abilities

Wallace once worked as a short-order cook for a while. He is mostly a talented painter (his works are never shown but every character who sees them is impressed) and wishes to make a living through it.

Wallace is one of the most skilled characters in martial arts, being able to take Manute down single-handedly and with relative ease. He tries to be patient with his opponents, giving fair warning to back off,  but is always driven to violence, and proves to be far more dangerous than he looks. He is also a skilled gunman, often using Beretta 92F pistols. When acting in stealth, he uses a machete.
As said before, Wallace is as calm as an executioner. Thanks to this and meditation, he keeps his senses to master the situations. He is also very observant.

During most of his adventure, Wallace fights his enemies (and even police) all by himself. His only notable allies are two of his former comrades, 'Captain' and his life partner Jerry.

Film appearance
Wallace is set to appear in Sin City 3 (tentatively titled Frank Miller's Sin City: Hell and Back, if going with the naming pattern of the previous films), to be directed by Robert Rodriguez and Frank Miller. Rodriguez has said he wants Johnny Depp to play the part. Depp was originally supposed to play the part of Benicio del Toro's Jack "Jackie Boy" Rafferty. However, filming of Sin City conflicted with that of Depp's movies. Depp has expressed great interest in being a part of the Sin City franchise.

References

Comics characters introduced in 1999
Sin City characters
Fictional artists
Fictional characters from Washington (state)
Fictional MCMAP practitioners
Fictional Medal of Honor recipients
Fictional military personnel in comics
Fictional United States Navy SEALs personnel
Characters created by Frank Miller (comics)
Vigilante characters in comics